John Unstead (9 February 1790 – 22 October 1872) was an English cricketer who played for Kent. He was born and died in Waldron.

Unstead made a single first-class appearance in 1825, scoring just one run in the two innings in which he batted. While his complete bowling information in unclear, it is known that he took at least five wickets.

References

1790 births
1872 deaths
English cricketers
Kent cricketers
English cricketers of 1787 to 1825